Woodleaf, California may refer to:
 Woodleaf, Napa County, California
 Woodleaf, Yuba County, California